The 2017 Women's European Volleyball Championship was the 30th edition of the European Volleyball Championship, organised by Europe's governing volleyball body, the Confédération Européenne de Volleyball. The tournament was co-hosted by Azerbaijan and Georgia, and was held between 22 September and 1 October 2017.

Serbia defeated Netherlands in the final to capture their second european title. Turkey defeated Azerbaijan for the bronze medal. Tijana Bošković from Serbia was elected the MVP.

Qualification

Format
The tournament is played in two different stages. In the first stage, the sixteen participants are divided in four groups of four teams each. A single round-robin format is played within each group to determine the teams' group position (as per criteria below). The three best teams of each group (total of 12 teams) progress to the second stage, with group winners advancing to the quarterfinals while second and third placed teams advancing to the playoffs.

Pool standing criteria
 Number of matches won
 Match points
 Sets ratio
 Points ratio
 Result of the match between the tied teams
Match won 3–0 or 3–1: 3 match points for the winner, 0 match points for the loser
Match won 3–2: 2 match points for the winner, 1 match point for the loser

The second stage of the tournament consists of a single-elimination, with winners advancing to the next round. First, the playoff is played (involving groups second and third places) to determine which teams will join the group winners in the quarterfinals, followed by semifinals, 3rd place match and final.

Pools composition

Squads

Venues
Three venues (each in a different city) were selected to be used in the tournament. Two located in Azerbaijan (at Baku and Ganja) and one in Georgia (at Tbilisi).

Preliminary round
All times are Azerbaijan Time (AZT) / Georgia Time (GET) (UTC+04:00).

Pool A
venue: National Gymnastics Arena, Baku, Azerbaijan

Pool B
venue: Tbilisi Sports Palace, Tbilisi, Georgia

Pool C
venue: National Gymnastics Arena, Baku, Azerbaijan

Pool D
venue: Göygöl Olympic Sport Complex, Ganja, Azerbaijan

Championship round
All times are Azerbaijan Time (AZT) (UTC+04:00).
venue: National Gymnastics Arena, Baku, Azerbaijan

Bracket

Playoffs

Quarterfinals

Semifinals

Third place game

Final

Final standing

Individual awards

Most Valuable Player
  Tijana Bošković
Best Setter
  Laura Dijkema
Best Outside Spikers
  Brankica Mihajlović
  Anne Buijs
Best Middle Blockers
  Eda Erdem Dündar
  Stefana Veljković
Best Opposite Spiker
  Lonneke Slöetjes
Best Libero
  Valeriya Mammadova

See also
2017 Men's European Volleyball Championship

References

External links
Official website
CEV website

Women's European Volleyball Championships
2017 Women's European Volleyball Championship
2017 Women's European Volleyball Championship
Volleyball
European Volleyball Championship
European Volleyball Championship
European Volleyball Championship
Volleyball competitions in Azerbaijan
Volleyball competitions in Georgia (country)
Sports competitions in Baku
Sports competitions in Tbilisi
Sport in Ganja, Azerbaijan
September 2017 sports events in Europe
October 2017 sports events in Europe
Women's volleyball in Georgia (country)
Women's volleyball in Azerbaijan